Melvin Hochster (born August 2, 1943) is an American mathematician working in commutative algebra.  He is currently the Jack E. McLaughlin Distinguished University Professor of Mathematics at the University of Michigan.

Education
Hochster attended Stuyvesant High School, where he was captain of the Math Team, and received a B.A. from Harvard University.  While at Harvard, he was a Putnam Fellow in 1960.  He earned his Ph.D. in 1967 from Princeton University, where he wrote a dissertation under Goro Shimura characterizing the prime spectra of commutative rings.

Career
He held positions at the University of Minnesota and Purdue University before joining the faculty at Michigan in 1977.

Hochster's work is primarily in commutative algebra, especially the study of modules over local rings.  He has established classic theorems concerning Cohen–Macaulay rings, invariant theory and homological algebra.  For example, the Hochster–Roberts theorem states that the invariant ring of a linearly reductive group acting on a regular ring is Cohen–Macaulay.  His best-known work is on the homological conjectures, many of which he established for local rings containing a field, thanks to his proof of the existence of big Cohen–Macaulay modules and his technique of reduction to prime characteristic.  His most recent work on tight closure, introduced in 1986 with Craig Huneke, has found unexpected applications throughout commutative algebra and algebraic geometry.

He has had more than 40 doctoral students, and the Association for Women in Mathematics has pointed out his outstanding role in mentoring women students pursuing a career in mathematics. He served as the chair of the department of Mathematics at the University of Michigan from 2008 to 2017.

Awards
Hochster shared the 1980 Cole Prize with Michael Aschbacher, received a Guggenheim Fellowship in 1981, and has been a member of both the National Academy of Sciences and the American Academy of Arts and Sciences since 1992. In 2008, on the occasion of his 65th birthday, he was honored with a conference in Ann Arbor and with a special volume of the Michigan Mathematical Journal.

See also
Monomial conjecture

References

External links

Hochster's home page at Michigan
Some expository papers by Mel Hochster
Hochster's blurb at the National Academies
The University Record (October 8, 2004)
Men and the AWM
Page of the conference in honor of Mel Hochster (2008)

Members of the United States National Academy of Sciences
20th-century American mathematicians
21st-century American mathematicians
Algebraists
Stuyvesant High School alumni
Harvard University alumni
Princeton University alumni
University of Michigan faculty
Purdue University faculty
University of Minnesota faculty
Putnam Fellows
Living people
1943 births
Scientists from New York City
Mathematicians from New York (state)